Captain James William Pearson was an American World War I flying ace credited with twelve aerial victories while flying for the British Royal Air Force.

Early life
Pearson's home town was Nutley, New Jersey, despite being born in Connecticut.

World War I

Pearson was promoted to 2nd lieutenant (temporarily) in October 1917.

He was assigned to No. 23 Squadron RFC at Bertangles, which originally operated Spads. They later re-equipped with Sopwith Dolphins, and Pearson began to score confirmed victories of enemy aircraft. Between 30 May and 1 November 1918, he destroyed six enemy planes (one of which was a joint victory with Harry Compton) and drove six others down out of control.

Aerial victories

Postwar
Pearson founded the J. W. Pearson Textile Company, from which he retired in 1960. Upon his death in 1993, it was realized that Pearson was the last surviving American ace from World War I.

Honors and awards

Distinguished Flying Cross (DFC)

Lieut. (A./Capt.) James William Pearson. (FRANCE)
   
On 26 October, while leading a patrol, this officer observed a formation of enemy scouts. Diving to the attack, he engaged one and drove it down out of control. He then attacked a second, which he drove down to crash. In all he has accounted for seven enemy aircraft, setting at all times a fine example of skill and courageous determination.

See also

 List of World War I flying aces from the United States

References

Bibliography
 American Aces of World War 1 Harry Dempsey. Osprey Publishing, 2001. , .
 Over the Front: A Complete Record of the Fighter Aces and Units of the United States and French Air Services, 1914–1918 Norman L. R. Franks, Frank W. Bailey. Grub Street, 1992. , .

1895 births
1993 deaths
Military personnel from Bridgeport, Connecticut
American World War I flying aces